Cairn of Claise is a mountain in the Grampians of Scotland, located about three miles from the Glenshee Ski Center near Braemar.

References

Munros
Mountains and hills of the Eastern Highlands
Mountains and hills of Aberdeenshire
One-thousanders of Scotland